John L. Synge Award is an award by the Royal Society of Canada for outstanding research in any branch of the mathematical sciences. It was created in 1986 and is given at irregular intervals. The award is named in honor of John Lighton Synge.

Winners 
Source: Royal Society of Canada
1987 – James G. Arthur, FRSC
1993 – Israel Michael Sigal, FRSC
1996 – Joel Feldman, FRSC  
1999 – George A. Elliott, FRSC  
2006 – Stephen Cook, FRSC 
2008 – Henri Darmon, FRSC
2014 – Bálint Virág
2018 – Bojan Mohar, FRSC
2020 – Christian Genest, FRSC 
2021 – Paul McNicholas

See also

 List of mathematics awards 
 Laureates 2020

References

External links 
RSC page for the award

Canadian science and technology awards
Mathematics awards
Royal Society of Canada